The 1898 New York state election was held on November 8, 1898, to elect the governor, the lieutenant governor, the Secretary of State, the state comptroller, the attorney general, the state treasurer and the state engineer, as well as all members of the New York State Assembly and the New York State Senate.

History
The Prohibition state convention met on June 30 at Syracuse, New York, and nominated Prof John Kline, of Penn Yan, for governor, Rev. John A. Sayles, of East Aurora, for lieutenant governor; Henry Wilbur, editor of True Reform, of New York City, for secretary of state; Charles Mills, of Sodus, for comptroller; De Witt Hooker, of Syracuse, for treasurer; Francis Stephen M. Wing, of Canastota, for attorney general; and Albert W. Pierson, of Niagara Falls, for state engineer.

The Socialist Labor state convention met on August 27 at Rochester, New York, and nominated Benjamin Hanford for governor; Leander A. Armstrong, of Buffalo, for lieutenant governor; Philip Jackson, of Rochester, for secretary of state; Charles H. Corregan, for attorney general; Max Forker, of New York City, for comptroller; Joseph Smith, of Yonkers, for treasurer; and John H. Morris of Yonkers, for state engineer.

The Republican bosses Thomas C. Platt and Benjamin B. Odell, Jr., were still busy to compose a ticket on September 25, but had already agreed upon Theodore Roosevelt to head it, against the wish of Governor Frank S. Black to be re-nominated. The state convention met on September 27 at Saratoga Springs, New York. Sereno E. Payne was Temporary Chairman until the choice of Horace White as Permanent Chairman. Theodore Roosevelt was nominated for governor on the first ballot (vote: Roosevelt 753, Black 218). The other candidates were nominated by acclamation with exception of John C. Davies for Attorney General who was nominated on the first ballot (vote: Davies 741, John M. Kellogg 229).

The Democratic state convention met on September 28 and 29 at Syracuse, New York. Frederick C. Schraub, the 1896 Lt. Gov. nominee, was Permanent Chairman. Augustus Van Wyck, the brother of the incumbent first Mayor of the consolidated City of New York, was nominated for governor on the first ballot (vote: Van Wyck 351, John B. Stanchfield 41, Robert C. Titus 39, James K. McGuire 19). The other candidates were nominated by acclamation. The ticket was a compromise between the three biggest Democratic bosses: David B. Hill from upstate, Richard Croker of Tammany, and Hugh McLaughlin of Brooklyn.

The National Democratic State Committee met on September 30 at 52, William Street, in New York City. Chairman Robert A. Weidenmann - the only man to speak out loud against Judge Isaac H. Maynard's nomination in 1893 - presided. They decided not to call a convention, and not to endorse any candidates.

Returning from Cuba as a war hero, Theodore Roosevelt used the Citizens Union in an astute scheme to get the Republican nomination, in spite of not being a machine Republican and having in mind to uproot the Republican "spoilsmen". He approached the Citizens Union and suggested the nomination of a state ticket what was endorsed by the Citizens' Union Executive Committee with only three dissenting votes. An "Independent Citizens Committee" was formed, and 6,000 signatures for a petition to file a ticket were gathered, the signers believing that Roosevelt headed the ticket and that the Citizens Union backed it. To avoid being ousted from power in an uncertain three-cornered election, the Republican bosses offered Roosevelt the nomination, and suddenly on September 24, he declined to allow his name to be used on the independent ticket. On September 30, a majority of the Citizens Union Executive Committee, led by Chairman R. Fulton Cutting, rejected the idea of a state ticket as "not only inconsistent with, but actually opposed to the fundamental principles and objects of the Citizens' Union," The Independent Citizens Committee answered next day and declared that nominations will be made. The petition to file the independent ticket was taken to the Secretary of State's office on October 12 purporting to represent nominations by the Citizens Union. The Secretary of State reserved his decision if the ticket would be filed or not. On this ticket were Theodore Roosevelt - already nominated by the Republicans state convention in September - for governor; Thomas M. Osborne for lieutenant governor; Oren E. Wilson, Mayor of Albany 1894-1895, for secretary of state; Thomas E. Kinney, Mayor of Utica, for comptroller; Edmund H. Titchener, of Binghamton, for treasurer; Frederick W. Hinrichs, the Gold Democrats nominee for lieutenant governor in 1896, for attorney general; and George E. Waring, Jr., of New York City, for state engineer. Roosevelt immediately sent a letter of declination to the Secretary of State. Besides, Republican party officials protested against the petition. The Independent Citizens' Committee on Vacancies substituted Theodore Bacon, a lawyer of Rochester, on the ticket, and Citizens Union Chairman R. Fulton Cutting, despite his earlier rejection of the state ticket idea per se, campaigned for the ticket.

Result
The whole Republican ticket was elected in a tight race.

The incumbent Woodruff was re-elected.

The Republican, Democratic, Prohibition and Socialist Labor parties maintained automatic ballot status (necessary 10,000).

Notes

Sources
How to vote split tickets: HOW TO MARK THE BALLOT in NYT on October 31, 1898
The Democratic nominees: THE DEMOCRATIC TICKET.; Sketches of the Men Nominated for Office by the Syracuse Convention in NYT on September 30, 1898
Result: NEW YORK'S OFFICIAL VOTE in NYT on December 30, 1898
Result: The Tribune Almanac 1899
Result in New York County: OFFICIAL ELECTION FIGURES.; Vote Cast in New York County... in NYT on December 24, 1898
Result in Kings County: ...The Official Vote in Kings in NYt on December 4, 1898

See also
New York gubernatorial elections

1898
1898 New York (state) elections